William Wells (b. 1832 - d. February 8, 1868) was a United States Navy sailor and a recipient of America's highest military decoration—the Medal of Honor—for his actions in the American Civil War.

Wells had reached the rank of quartermaster by the time his Medal of Honor was awarded on December 31, 1864.

Medal of Honor citation
Rank and organization: Quartermaster, U.S. Navy. Born: 1832, Germany. Accredited to: New York. G.O. No.: 45, December 31, 1864.

Citation:

As landsman and lookout on board the U.S.S. Richmond during action against rebel forts and gunboats and with the ram Tennessee in Mobile Bay, 5 August 1864. Despite damage to his ship the loss of several men on board as enemy fire raked her decks, Wells performed his duties with skill and courage throughout a furious 2-hour battle which resulted in the surrender of the rebel ram Tennessee and in the damaging and destruction of batteries at Fort Morgan.

See also

 List of American Civil War Medal of Honor recipients: T–Z

References
 

1832 births
Year of death missing
German emigrants to the United States
United States Navy Medal of Honor recipients
Quartermasters
Union Navy sailors
United States Navy sailors
German-born Medal of Honor recipients
American Civil War recipients of the Medal of Honor